James Dougal (3 October 1913 – 17 October 1999) was a Scottish footballer who played as an inside forward for Kilsyth Rangers, Falkirk, Preston North End, Carlisle United, Halifax Town and Chorley, either side of World War II.

He featured on the losing side (playing at outside right) in the 1937 FA Cup Final with Preston – where there was a large contingent of Scottish players in the period – but did not take part the following year when the Lilywhites claimed the trophy due to injury. He was the club's top goalscorer in the 1938–39 season, and won the Football League War Cup in 1941.

He represented Scotland once, scoring his side's goal in a 2–1 defeat to England in April 1939. He also scored in an unofficial wartime International, also against England, in May 1940.

His brothers Billy (18 years older) and Peter and nephew Neil were also footballers, the latter playing for Scotland six years after Jimmy.

See also
List of Scottish football families 
List of Scotland national football team captains
 List of Scotland wartime international footballers

References

1913 births
1999 deaths
People from Denny, Falkirk
Scottish footballers
Association football inside forwards
Association football outside forwards
Kilsyth Rangers F.C. players
Falkirk F.C. players
Preston North End F.C. players
Carlisle United F.C. players
Halifax Town A.F.C. players
Chorley F.C. players
Scottish Football League players
English Football League players
Scotland international footballers
Footballers from Falkirk (council area)
Scotland wartime international footballers
FA Cup Final players
Scottish Junior Football Association players